Indiscriminate monitoring is the mass monitoring of individuals or groups without the careful judgement of wrong-doing. This form of monitoring could be done by government agencies, employers, and retailers. Indiscriminate monitoring uses tools such as email monitoring, telephone tapping, geo-locations, health monitoring to monitor private lives. Organizations that conduct indiscriminate monitoring may also use surveillance technologies to collect large amounts of data that could violate privacy laws or regulations. These practices could impact individuals emotionally, mentally, and globally. The government has also issued various protections to protect against indiscriminate monitoring.

Surveillance methods 
Indiscriminate monitoring could occur through electronic employee monitoring, social networking, targeted advertising, and geological health monitoring. All of these tools are used to monitor individuals without the direct knowledge of the individual.

Electronic Employee monitoring is the use of electronic devices to collect data to monitor an employee's performance or general being. The indiscriminate justification for monitoring includes, but is not limited to:

 The productivity of the employees.
 Legal liability of the company.
 Prevention of company confidentiality.
 Prevention of company data breaches.
 Prevention of workplace policy deviance.

Electronic Employee monitoring uses many tools to monitor employees. One of the most common tools of Electronic Employee monitoring is the use of monitoring technology Email monitoring involves the employers using employee monitoring software to collect data on every single time an employee comes in contact with technology in the workplace. The software will also monitor all passwords, websites, social media, email, screenshots, and other computer actions. In most jurisdictions employers are permitted to use monitoring to protect the company's assets, increase productivity, or protect themselves from liability. However, the impact on privacy could affect employee contentment and well being at the company.

Social Media Monitoring is the use of social media measurement and other technologies to capture the data individuals share via these networks. Social networks may allow third-parties to obtain the personal information of individuals through terms-of-agreements. In addition to social media networks collecting information for analytics, government agencies also use social media monitoring for public issues and other manners. The government uses the often public data of social media to conduct data collection on individuals or groups of people.

Targeted advertising is a method used by companies to monitor customer tastes and preferences in order to create personalized advertising. Companies conduct mass surveillance by monitoring user activity and IP activity. Many companies justify targeted advertising by the social and economic implications. However, the indiscriminate privacy  violations of producing targeted advertisements, cause consumers to have great concerns.

Geological health monitoring is the monitoring of an individuals's location and/or health through tools to collect personal information. Geological health monitoring can be conducted through smart toys, home surveillance systems, fitness watches or applications. Technological devices such as, fitness watches could serve as a great tool. However, they do have privacy implications that could risk health data exposure.

Privacy in the U.S. Constitution 
The right to privacy in the constitution is most explicitly mentioned in Amendment I, Amendment III, and Amendment IV of the U.S. Constitution. The privacy of belief, privacy of home, and privacy of the person and possessions is included in the U.S. Constitution.

Government protections 
In 2007, the Bush Administration announced that they would issue warrants for the NSA conducting surveillance of citizens without warrants. This announcement provided further protection against Indiscriminate monitoring because it prevented individuals from being monitored without just cause.

FISA amendments were passed to promote national security and privacy. These amendments require the NSA to complete certification annually. Furthermore, these amendments state that the use of mass surveillance information for any reason other than national security is prohibited.

In 2020, Proposition 24, the Privacy Rights and Enforcement Act Initiative, appeared as a California ballot proposition. This act states that consumers can prevent companies from sharing their personal information. Also, this act can prevent companies from withholding the personal information of individuals through data collection for a long period of time.

The Controversies of Indiscriminate Monitoring 
There may be emotional and mental considerations in regards to indiscriminate monitoring. When individuals know they are monitored, it could produce stress, frustration, and a negative attitude. Individuals could feel degraded if their privacy is infringed on. For example, in the workplace employee monitoring if employees know that their emails and such were being monitored, this could stir up distrust within the workplace and increase job dissatisfaction.

Research 
Recently, researchers have been discussing the implications of indiscriminate monitoring, the public space, and the government's role. One argument states that the indiscriminate monitoring of the government inflicts on the right to privacy and results in harm to citizens.

References

Espionage techniques
Mass surveillance
Privacy